Kathleen Horvath won in the final 6–4, 6–3 against Marcela Skuherská.

Seeds
A champion seed is indicated in bold text while text in italics indicates the round in which that seed was eliminated.

  Iva Budařová (quarterfinals)
  Kathleen Horvath (champion)
  Kate Latham (first round)
  Candy Reynolds (second round)
 n/a
  Vicki Nelson (quarterfinals)
  Nancy Yeargin (second round)
  Jennifer Mundel (first round)
  Susan Rollinson (first round)

Draw

External links
 1983 Virginia Slims of Nashville Draw

Virginia Slims of Nashville
1983 Virginia Slims World Championship Series